Dokken: The Definitive Rock Collection a 2-disc compilation album by the American heavy metal  band Dokken, released in 2006 by Rhino Records.

Track listing

Disc 1
"Breaking the Chains" - 3:51
"Felony" - 3:09
"Live to Rock (Rock to Live)" - 3:36
"Nightrider" - 3:14
"Paris Is Burning" (live) - 5:08
"Tooth and Nail" - 3:41
"Just Got Lucky" - 4:35
"Don't Close Your Eyes" - 4:11
"Into the Fire" - 4:27
"Alone Again" - 4:22
"Turn On the Action" - 4:46
"Unchain the Night" - 5:20
"The Hunter" - 4:08
"In My Dreams" - 4:20
"Lightnin' Strikes Again" - 3:48
"It's Not Love" - 4:59
"Till the Livin' End" - 4:02

Disc 2
"Prisoner" - 4:21
"Heaven Sent" - 4:53
"Mr. Scary" - 4:31
"So Many Tears" - 4:57
"Burning Like a Flame" - 4:44
"Dream Warriors" - 4:46
"Walk Away" - 5:01
"Kiss of Death" (live) - 5:30
"When Heaven Comes Down" (live) - 3:56
"Standing in the Shadows" (live) - 4:37
"Too High to Fly" - 7:12
"Long Way Home" - 5:13
"Escape" - 4:37

Personnel

Dokken 
Don Dokken - lead vocals, guitar
George Lynch - guitar, background vocals
Juan Croucier - bass guitar, background vocals
Mick Brown - drums, background vocals
Jeff Pilson - bass guitar, background vocals
Jon Levin - guitar, background vocals
Barry Sparks - bass guitar

References

2006 greatest hits albums
Dokken compilation albums
Rhino Records compilation albums